Christoph Joseph Günther (born 22 July 1975) is a German professional golfer who plays on the Challenge Tour and the EPD Tour.

Günther was born in Göttingen. He has mainly played on the EPD Tour since turning professional in 1995. He has won eight times on the EPD Tour between 2001 and 2008.

Günther won his first tournament on the Challenge Tour in 2009 at the Kärnten Golf Open. He entered the final round five strokes behind the leader but shot a fantastic final round of 62 (-10) to win by a stroke. The win put him into a good position to finish high enough on the Challenge Tour's 2009 money list to earn a European Tour card for 2010.

Professional wins (18)

Challenge Tour wins (1)

EPD Tour wins (10)

Other wins (7)
1999 Brose Coburg Open (Germany)
2001 German PGA Championship
2003 German PGA Championship
2005 Bad Homburger Open (Germany)
2006 German PGA Team Championship (with Marcel Haremza)
2007 German PGA Team Championship (with Marcel Haremza)
2010 German PGA Team Championship (with Marcel Haremza)

References

External links

German male golfers
European Tour golfers
Sportspeople from Göttingen
1975 births
Living people